Jean Baptiste Senaillé (23 November 1687 – 15 October 1730) was a French born Baroque composer and violin virtuoso. His father was a member of Les Vingt-quatre Violons du Roi. Senaillé studied under Jean-Baptiste Anet, Giovanni Antonio Piani and in Italy under Tomaso Antonio Vitali and imported Italian musical techniques and pieces into the French court. He wrote around 50 violin sonatas. He is most well known for a fast 2/4 movement from one of these sonatas, Allegro spiritoso, which has had versions published transcribed for a wide variety of instruments, from cello to bassoon to euphonium.

Some of these transcriptions were edited by Robin De Smet.

Selected recordings 

 Premier Livre de Sonates à violon seul avec la Basse continue, Odile Édouard, violin, Freddy Eichelberger, harpsichord, Emmanuel Jacques, cello & violin bass (K617 2004)
 Sonata in E minor op.4 n°5, Sonata in G minor op.1 n°6, Sonata in D major op.3 n°10, Sonata in C minor op.1 n°5, Théotime Langlois de Swarte, violin, William Christie harpsichord. CD Harmonia Mundi 2021. Choc Classica

External links
Biographical notes on Senaille

Musicians from Paris
1687 births
1730 deaths
French Baroque composers
French classical composers
French male classical composers
18th-century French male classical violinists
18th-century classical composers
18th-century French composers
17th-century male musicians